Panagiotis Ventouris (14 February 1944 – 10 June 2002) was a Greek professional footballer who played as an attacking midfielder.

Club career

Early years
Ventouris started his football career, when at the age of 12 signed a sports card at Fostiras, where in 1958 was promoted to the men's team. He was a member of the great team that won the second division in their respective group and were promoted to the recently established first national division. Fostiras stayed for two seasons in the top and in 1963 was relegated again, but Ventouris had shown examples of his talent and his football value. In the summer of 1965, AEK Athens acquired him as part of the renewal of the club's roster that they were attempting, having spent the particularly important for the time amount of 435,000 drachmas.

AEK Athens
In September 1965, disillusioned by the club management's failure to promise professional rehabilitation, Ventouris left AEK and Greece to play alongside his former teammates in Fostiras, Deimezis and Aidiniotis in the non-FIFA professional South African League at Hellenic from Cape Town. The new contacts and discussions with the management of AEK, towards the end of the season and got him to return to Greece and AEK. In the summer of 1966, under Tryfon Tzanetis, they emerged as Cup winners as the other finalist, Olympiacos did not accept to participate in the Final. He scored for the first time with the club on 30 October 1966 against Vyzas Megara, scoring both goals in the 2–0 home win. In 1968 this time under Jenő Csaknády, they won the Championship, where he had a decisive contribution, as well as in the Championship of 1971 with Branko Stanković. He had a major contribution in the course of the team to the final in the Balkans Cup in 1967, where the lost to Fenerbahçe. He also scored twice in the institution of the following year, scoring the only goal of his team in the 2–1 away defeat against Spartak Sofia and in the 3–1 win against Fenerbahçe at home. In his 7 appearances for the European Cup he scored 3 times including a brace in the 3–2 away defeat against Jeunesse Esch on 2 October 1968, where they eventually reached the quarter-finals of the tournament and once against Internazionale at home, equalizing the game before the final 3–2 win on 29 September 1972.

Later career
In the summer of 1972, as a part of the renewal of the club's roster by Stanković, he left AEK and moved to Cyprus and signed for Anorthosis Famagusta, where he played for one season, before he returned to Greece to play for Agioi Anargyroi. He competed in the Athens EPS League before retiring from football in the summer of 1974.

International career

Ventouris made 2 appearances with Greece in 1963. On 14 April 1963, he played at a friendly match was held in Lisbon for Greece U21 against Portugal, but it proved to be a men's team, as players of 25 and 26 years old were competing. He made his official debut alongside his future teammate at AEK, Mimis Papaioannou who played as the captain of Greece, on 27 November 1963 in a friendly away 3–1 loss against Cyprus, under his also future manager at AEK, Tryfon Tzanetis.

Personal life
Ventouris worked at the PPC, while he was playing for AEK. He had a wife named Evgenia and two children named Antonis and Athanasia. He died on 10 June 2002, at the age of only 59, from heart attack and after suffering in his last years from health problems with rheumatoid arthritis.

Honours

Fostiras
Beta Ethniki: 1959–60 (Central Group)

AEK Athens
Alpha Ethniki: 1967–68, 1970–71
Greek Cup: 1965–66

References

Notes

 a.  Includes only the first division stats.

External links

1943 births
2002 deaths
Greece international footballers
Fostiras F.C. players
AEK Athens F.C. players
Hellenic F.C. players
Anorthosis Famagusta F.C. players
Super League Greece players
Association football midfielders
Footballers from Athens
Greek footballers
Greek expatriate footballers
Expatriate footballers in Cyprus
Greek expatriate sportspeople in Cyprus